Erin Smith is an American entrepreneur and inventor. She is the founder of FacePrint, a medical technology venture that is developing facial recognition software to assist with the diagnosis of Parkinson's disease. Smith was a Thiel Fellow in 2018, and was awarded the first place Young Inventors Prize from the European Patent Office in 2022.

Biography 
Erin Smith was raised in Lenexa, Kansas, a suburb of Kansas City. She has two older sisters and two younger brothers. 

During high school, while watching a video interview of Michael J. Fox, who has been diagnosed with Parkinson's disease, she observed a distinct emotional distance in his facial expressions. She had also previously watched the show Lie To Me, which features a scientist character based on Paul Ekman, who studied facial expressions, which contributed to her interest in developing technology to detect Parkinson's by monitoring faces. Smith continued to watch more video interviews of people with Parkinson's and conducted her own research. 

During a spring break from school, she conducted a study on people with Parkinson's and control subjects without Parkinson's, to document both spontaneous expressions in response to videos and intentional expressions made by subjects attempting to mirror another face. She used the facial recognition software Affdex to help measure the results. She later received support from The Michael J. Fox Foundation for two additional pilot studies, including a study that that filmed subjects with webcams while they watched Super Bowl commercials and tried to mirror the expressions of emoji. 

In 2016, she participated in the BuiltByGirls Future Founder challenge at Twitter headquarters and won a $10,000 prize to continue researching and developing the app, and apply for a full patent on her work. Smith also received mentoring from the University of Missouri–Kansas City Small Business & Technology Development Center for two years to develop FacePrint into a business. 

In 2017, Smith was selected for the Research Science Institute summer program jointly sponsored by the Center for Excellence in Education and MIT. She graduated high school in 2018 and was accepted by Stanford University, but deferred admission to become a 2018 Thiel Fellow for two years. FacePrint began clinical trials in 2019 with Stanford Medical School and the Michael J. Fox Foundation.

As a student at Stanford University, Smith became an ambassador for the IF/THEN collective, an organization that seeks to support women in STEM careers.

Awards and honors 
 2017 International BioGENEius Challenge
 2018 Davidson Fellow
 2018 Global Teen Leader
 2018 Regeneron STS Scholar by the Society for Science and the Public
 2018 Thiel Fellow
 2019 Wired Top Health Startup
 2019 Forbes 30 Under 30
 2020 Voices of the Year, Seventeen Magazine
 2022 European Patent Office Young Inventor Award, 1st place

References 

Living people
People from Lenexa, Kansas
1999 births
Thiel fellows
21st-century American women
21st-century inventors